Kaslan Qayah (also Romanized as Kaslān Qayah, Kaslān Qayeh, and Kaslānqayah; also known as Karāsangiyeh and Kaslan Fih) is a village in Gol Tappeh Rural District, Gol Tappeh District, Kabudarahang County, Hamadan Province, Iran. At the 2006 census, its population was 425, in 95 families.

References 

Populated places in Kabudarahang County